This is a list of notable sailboat designers and manufacturers, which are described by an article in English Wikipedia. Sailboat design and manufacturing is done by a number of companies and groups.

Notable designers

Sailboat designer articles in Wikipedia:

Alan Payne
Archibald Cary Smith
Ben Lexcen
Bill Langan
Bill Lapworth
Bill Lee
Bill Luders
Britton Chance Jr.
Bruce Farr
Bruce Kirby
Bruce Nelson
Carl Alberg
Charles Ernest Nicholson
Charley Morgan
C. Raymond Hunt Associates
Dennison J. Lawlor
Doug Peterson
Edward Burgess
Edwin Augustus Stevens Jr., Cox & Stevens
E.G. van de Stadt
Frank Bethwaite
Gary Mull
Germán Frers
George Cassian
George Harding Cuthbertson
George Hinterhoeller
George Lennox Watson
George Steers
Graham & Schlageter
Greg Elliott
Gregory C. Marshall Naval Architect Ltd.
Group Finot
Jens Quorning
Johann Tanzer
John Alden
John Beavor-Webb
John Illingworth
John Laurent Giles
John Marples
John Westell
Juan Kouyoumdjian
J&J Design
Rodney Johnstone
Laurie Davidson
Lyle Hess
Mark Ellis
McCurdy & Rhodes
Myron Spaulding
Nathanael Greene Herreshoff
Olin Stephens & Roderick Stephens, Sparkman & Stephens
Philip Rhodes
Reichel/Pugh
Raymond Creekmore
Robert Perry
Robert W. Ball
Ron Holland
Sandy Douglass
Starling Burgess
Ted Gozzard
Ted Hood
Ted Irwin
Tony Castro
VPLP
William Fife
William Ion Belton Crealock
William Shaw

Notable manufacturers

Sailboat manufacturer articles in Wikipedia:

Aegean Yacht
Albin Marine
Alexander Stephen and Sons
Alloy Yachts
Aloha Yachts
Alsberg Brothers Boatworks
Amel Yachts
Archambault Boats
Ariel Patterson
Austral Yachts
Baltic Yachts
Bavaria
Bayfield Boat Yard
Beneteau
Bowman Yachts
Bristol Yachts
C&C Yachts
C. & R. Poillon
Cabo Rico Yachts
Cal Yachts
Calgan Marine
Cape Cod Shipbuilding
Capital Yachts
Cape Dory Yachts
Caribbean Sailing Yachts
Cascade Yachts
Catalina Yachts
Cavalier Yachts
Clark Boat Company
Classic Yachts
Columbia Yachts
Com-Pac Yachts
Cooper Enterprises
Cornish Crabbers
Coronado Yachts
Coastal Recreation
CS Yachts
CW Hood Yachts
David Carll
Dehler Yachts
Douglass & McLeod
Down East Yachts
Dragonfly Trimarans 
Dufour Yachts
Endeavour Yacht Corporation
Ericson Yachts
ETAP Yachting
Freedom Yachts
George Lawley & Son
Grampian Marine
Hake Yachts
Hallberg-Rassy
Hans Christian Yachts
Hanse Yachts
Hinckley Yachts
Hinterhoeller Yachts
Hodgdon Yachts
Holland Jachtbouw
Hughes Boat Works
Hunter Boats
Hylas Yachts
Irwin Yachts
Island Packet Yachts
Jensen Marine
J/Boats
Jakobson Shipyard
Jeanneau
Jesse Carll (shipbuilder)
Jeremy Rogers Limited
Johnson Boat Works
Jongert
J. Samuel White
Laguna Yachts
Lancer Yachts
Laser Performance
Lockley Newport Boats
MacGregor Yacht Corporation
Marlow-Hunter Marine
Montgomery Marine Products
Melges Performance Sailboats
Menger Boatworks
Mirage Yachts
Moses Adams (shipbuilder)
Najad Yachts
Nauticat Yachts Oy
Nautor's Swan
O'Day Corp.
Ontario Yachts
Oyster Marine
Paceship Yachts
Pacific Seacraft
Palmer Johnson
Pearson Yachts
Perini Navi
PlastiGlass
Pogo Structures
Precision Boat Works
Rosetti Marino
Royal Huisman
Royal Denship
Rustler Yachts
S2 Yachts
Seafarer Yachts
Seidelmann Yachts
Skene Boats
Smith and Rhuland
South Coast Seacraft
Sovereign Yachts
Su Marine Yachts
Tanzer Industries
Tartan Marine
Universal Marine
Vanguard Sailboats
Vandestadt and McGruer Limited
Varne Marine
W. D. Schock Corporation
Wally Yachts
Watkins Yachts
William H. Brown
X-Yachts

See also

List of sailing boat types
List of large sailing yachts

 

Sailboat
Sailboat
Sailboat manufacturers